XFL may refer to:

Sports
 XFL (2001), a defunct American football league that played its only season in 2001
 XFL (2020), a professional American football league

Vehicles
 Bell XFL Airabonita, a 1940 U.S. Navy experimental interceptor aircraft
 Jaguar XFL, a 2016–present Sino-British executive sedan
 Loening XFL, a canceled 1933 U.S. Navy fighter aircraft

Other uses
 Xinhua Finance Limited, part of Beat Holdings

See also

 Extreme Football League (disambiguation)
 X League (disambiguation)